Oklahoma Crude may refer to:

 Oklahoma Crude (film), a 1973 western drama
 Oklahoma Crude (indoor football), a defunct team in the U.S. National Indoor Football League